Cal is a surname. Notable people with the surname include:

 Anita M. Cal (born 1966), American writer
 David Cal (born 1982), Spanish sprint canoer
 Kaye Cal (born 1989), Filipino singer-songwriter
 Rafael Cal (born 1949), Mexican swimmer

See also
Da Cal, surname
Cal (given name)